Boudjemaâ El Ankis (born Casbah of Algiers, 17 June 1927 – died Algiers, 2 September 2015), also known as Mohammed Boudjemaâ, was an Algerian performer of chaâbi music, who also played the mondol.

He was known in Algeria for his more than 300 songs and for being imprisoned by the French from 1957-1960, for his protest of their occupation of Algeria.

He became a "pioneer" of Algerian music while working with lyricist Mahbou Bati and inspired a new generation of chaabi musicians.

Discography 

 Anya Bejfak
 El Kaoui
 El Meknin Ezin
 Meknasia
 Nousik Ya Hbibi
 Ya El Ghafel
 Ya Woulfi

References

External links
Obituary Algeria Press Service, Algeria: Boudjemaa El Ankis Laid to Rest At El Kettar Cemetery in Algiers

1927 births
2015 deaths
People from Casbah
Algerian mondol players
21st-century Algerian people